The 1998 election of members to the Senate of the Philippines was the 26th election to the Senate of the Philippines. It was held on Monday, May 11, 1998 to elect 12 of the 24 seats in the Senate. The two main competing coalitions in the senatorial election were Lakas—National Union of Christian Democrats—United Muslim Democrats of the Philippines and the Laban ng Makabayang Masang Pilipino umbrella coalition composed of Laban ng Demokratikong Pilipino, Pwersa ng Masang Pilipino, Nationalist People's Coalition, and Partido Demokratiko Pilipino—Lakas ng Bayan. The two coalitions split the 12 contested seats 7–5 in favor of LAMMP.

Candidates
The two major presidential candidates, House Speaker Jose C. de Venecia Jr. of Lakas—NUCD—UMDP and Vice President Joseph E. Estrada of LAMMP presented full 12-person senatorial slates.

Former National Defense Secretary Renato de Villa's Partido ng Demokratikong Reporma—Lapiang Manggagawa, Santiago Dumlao's Kilusan para sa Pambansang Pagpapanibago, and Manila Mayor Alfredo Lim's Liberal Party also presented senatorial slates.

Oliver Lozano was the sole independent not included in senatorial slates who was allowed to run.

Administration coalition
Lakas-NUCD-UMDP ticket:
Lisandro Abadia
Rolando Andaya
Robert Barbers
Rene Cayetano
Roberto de Ocampo
Ricardo Gloria
Teofisto Guingona Jr.
Loren Legarda
Roberto Pagdanganan
Hernando Perez
Nina Rasul
Ramon Revilla Sr.

Primary opposition coalition
Laban ng Makabayang Masang Pilipino ticket
Tessie Aquino-Oreta
Ramon Bagatsing Jr.
Rodolfo Biazon
Robert Jaworski
Edcel Lagman
Blas Ople
John Henry Osmeña
Aquilino Pimentel Jr.
Miguel Luis Romero
Tito Sotto
Ruben D. Torres
Freddie Webb

Other opposition coalitions
Partido ng Demokratikong Reporma-Lapiang Manggagawa ticket
Adolfo Geromino
Abraham Iribani
Rey Langit
Roberto Sebastian
Roy Señeres
Hadja Putri Tamano
Jose Villegas
Haydee Yorac
Liberal Party ticket
Raul Daza
Charito Plaza
Kilusan para sa Pambansang Pagbabago ticket
Ludovico Badoy
Eduardo Bondoc
David Castro
Renato Garcia
Fred Henry Marallag

Independent
Oliver Lozano

Retiring and term limited incumbents

 Heherson Alvarez (LDP), term limited, ran for representative from Isabela's 4th district and won; ran for senator in 2004 and lost
 Edgardo Angara (LDP), term limited, ran for Vice President of the Philippines and lost; ran for senator in 2001 and won
 Neptali Gonzales (LDP), term limited, retired from politics
 Ernesto Herrera (LDP), term limited, ran for representative from Bohol's 1st district and won; ran for senator in 2001 and in 2004 and lost both times
 Ernesto Maceda (NPC), term limited, ran for mayor of Manila and lost; ran for senator in 2004 and lost
 Orlando S. Mercado (LDP), term limited, was subsequently appointed as Secretary of National Defense; ran for senator in 2001 and in 2004 and lost both times
 Alberto Romulo (LDP), term limited
 Leticia Ramos-Shahani (Lakas), term limited, retired from politics

Incumbents running elsewhere
These all won in the 1995 election, and if lost, would have still returned to finish their six-year Senate term.
 Miriam Defensor Santiago (PRP), ran for President of the Philippines and lost
 Gloria Macapagal Arroyo (Lakas), ran for Vice President of the Philippines and won
 Raul Roco (Aksyon), ran for President of the Philippines and lost
Francisco Tatad (GAD), ran for Vice President of the Philippines and lost
Arroyo's victory in the vice presidential election meant that she would vacate her Senate seat by June 30, 1998.

Results 
The Laban ng Makabayang Masang Pilipino (LAMMP) won seven seats, while the Lakas-NUCD won five.

Three incumbents, all from LAMMP, successfully defended their seats: Blas Ople, Ramon Revilla Sr., and Tito Sotto.

There are five neophyte senators: Rene Cayetano, Loren Legarda, and Robert Barbers of Lakas, and Robert Jaworski and Tessie Aquino-Oreta of LAMMP.

Returning senators are Rodolfo Biazon, John Henry Osmeña, and Aquilino Pimentel Jr. of LAMMP, and Teofisto Guingona, Jr. of Lakas.

Freddie Webb was the sole incumbent defeated.

The election of Gloria Macapagal Arroyo as Vice President of the Philippines in a concurrent election meant that her Senate seat was vacant until June 30, 2001.

Key:
 ‡ Seats up
 + Gained by a party from another party
 √ Held by the incumbent
 * Held by the same party with a new senator
^ Vacancy

Per candidate

Per coalition

Per party

See also
Commission on Elections
Politics of the Philippines
Philippine elections
President of the Philippines
11th Congress of the Philippines

External links
 The Philippine Presidency Project
 Official website of the Commission on Elections
 Official website of the House of Representatives

1998
1998 elections in the Philippines